Bush Creek is a  long 2nd order tributary to the Cape Fear River in Lee County, North Carolina.

Course
Bush Creek rises about 4 miles northeast of Sanford, North Carolina and then flows northeasterly to join the Cape Fear River about 1 mile southeast of Brickhaven, North Carolina.

Watershed
Bush Creek drains  of area, receives about 47.6 in/year of precipitation, has a wetness index of 407.09 and is about 60% forested.

See also
List of rivers of North Carolina

References

Rivers of North Carolina
Rivers of Lee County, North Carolina
Tributaries of the Cape Fear River